There are between 24 and 77 prisons in Afghanistan. As of 2023, the total number of prisoners in the country is approximately 14,000 of which up to 1,100 are females. The following is an incomplete list of prisons in Afghanistan:

See also 

 Black jail
 Capital punishment in Afghanistan
 Do Ab prison
 List of countries by incarceration rate
 Mazari Sharif prison
 Qala-i-Jangi
 Rish Khor prison
 Sheberghan Prison

References

External links
 (South China Morning Post, Feb. 8, 2022)
 (South China Morning Post, Sep. 29, 2021)

Prisons
Afghanistan
Prisons